Shabalala may refer to:

 Headman Shabalala (1945–1991), member of Ladysmith Black Mambazo, a South African choral group founded by his brother Joseph
 Jockey Shabalala (1943–2006), member of Ladysmith Black Mambazo, a South African choral group founded by his brother Joseph
 Joseph Shabalala (1941–2020), founder and musical director of the South African choral group Ladysmith Black Mambazo
Lizzie Shabalala, South African politician
 Msizi Shabalala (born 1964), member of Ladysmith Black Mambazo, a South African choral group founded in 1960 by his father Joseph
 Nellie Shabalala (1953–2002), the wife of Ladysmith Black Mambazo (LBM) leader and founder, Joseph Shabalala, for more than 30 years
Nomvuzo Shabalala (1960–2020), South African politician
 Sibongiseni Shabalala (born 1972), member of Ladysmith Black Mambazo, a South African choral group founded in 1960 by his father Joseph
 Thamsanqa Shabalala (born 1974), member of Ladysmith Black Mambazo, a South African choral group founded in 1960 by his father Joseph
 Thulani Shabalala (born 1968), member of Ladysmith Black Mambazo, a South African choral group founded in 1960 by his father Joseph
 Nhlanhla Shabalala (born 1985), South African football (soccer) midfielder for Premier Soccer League club Ajax Cape Town

See also
Chabalala
Shalala

Surnames of African origin